Brożyna is a Polish surname. Notable people with the surname include:

Tomasz Brożyna (born 1970), Polish cyclist
Piotr Brożyna (born 1995), Polish cyclist, son of Tomasz

Polish-language surnames